Bruce Manson and Andrew Pattison were the defending champions but did not compete that year.

Jean-Louis Haillet and Gilles Moretton won in the final 7–6, 7–6 against John Lloyd and Tony Lloyd.

Seeds
Champion seeds are indicated in bold text while text in italics indicates the round in which those seeds were eliminated.

 Jean-Louis Haillet /  Gilles Moretton (champions)
 Corrado Barazzutti /  Antonio Zugarelli (quarterfinals)
 Patrice Dominguez /  Denis Naegelen (first round)
 Bernard Fritz /  Keith Richardson (semifinals)

Draw

External links
 1979 Paris Open Doubles draw

Doubles